Sultanpur is a Lok Sabha parliamentary constituency in Uttar Pradesh.

Assembly segments

Members of Parliament

Election results

General election 2019

General election 2014

General election 2009

Notes

See also
 Sultanpur
 List of Constituencies of the Lok Sabha

External links
Sultanpur lok sabha  constituency election 2019 result details

Lok Sabha constituencies in Uttar Pradesh
Sultanpur district